Tanja Bošković (born 27 June 1953) is a Serbian actress. She has performed in more than forty films since 1974.

Selected filmography

References

External links

Serbian film actresses
1953 births
Living people
Actresses from Belgrade
20th-century Serbian actresses
21st-century Serbian actresses